Jean-François Fortin (born March 15, 1979) is a Canadian former professional ice hockey defenceman.

Early life
Fortin was born in Laval, Quebec. As a youth, he played in the 1993 Quebec International Pee-Wee Hockey Tournament with a minor ice hockey team from the Mille-Îles area of Laval.

Career 
Fortin was drafted in the second round, 35th overall, by the Washington Capitals in the 1997 NHL Entry Draft. After playing four seasons in the Quebec Major Junior Hockey League with the Sherbrooke Faucons/Beavers, Fortin joined the Capitals' farm system with the ECHL's Hampton Roads Admirals and AHL's Portland Pirates in the 1999–2000 season.

Fortin made his NHL debut with the Capitals during the 2001–02. He has appeared in 71 NHL games with the Capitals during parts of three seasons, scoring one goal and adding four assists.

Fortin moved to Germany's Deutsche Eishockey Liga in 2006, playing for the Füchse Duisburg. He then moved to the Wolfsburg Grizzy Adams in 2007. For 2008-09, Fortin signed with HC MVD of the new Kontinental Hockey League, which replaced the Russian Super League but played just 4 games before returning to the DEL on 6 November 2008, moving to the Krefeld Pinguine. In 2009, he signed with EC VSV in the Austrian Hockey League. On March 12, 2010, Fortin announced his retirement.

Career statistics

References

External links

1979 births
Living people
Canadian expatriate ice hockey players in Austria
Canadian expatriate ice hockey players in Germany
Canadian expatriate ice hockey players in Russia
Canadian ice hockey defencemen
EC VSV players
Grizzlys Wolfsburg players
Füchse Duisburg players
French Quebecers
Hampton Roads Admirals players
HC MVD players
Hershey Bears players
Ice hockey people from Quebec
Krefeld Pinguine players
Portland Pirates players
Richmond Renegades players
Sherbrooke Castors players
Sherbrooke Faucons players
Sportspeople from Laval, Quebec
Washington Capitals draft picks
Washington Capitals players